Străoşti may refer to:

Străoşti, a village in Dragodana Commune, Dâmboviţa County, Romania
Străoşti, a village in Iordăcheanu Commune, Prahova County, Romania